Katherine, also spelled Catherine, and other variations are feminine names. They are popular in Christian countries because of their derivation from the name of one of the first Christian saints, Catherine of Alexandria.

In the early Christian era it came to be associated with the Greek adjective , meaning "pure", leading to the alternative spellings Katharine and Katherine. The former spelling, with a middle a, was more common in the past and is currently more popular in the United States than in Britain. Katherine, with a middle e, was first recorded in England in 1196 after being brought back from the Crusades.

Popularity and variations

English 
In Britain and America, Catherine and its variants have been among the 100 most popular names since 1880. The most common variants are Katherine, Kathryn, and Katharine. The spelling Catherine is common in both English and French. Less-common variants in English include Katheryn, Katharyn, Kathryne, Katheryne, Katherin, Kathrine, Catharine and Cathryn.

Kathleen or Cathleen, an Anglicized form of the Irish form Caitlín, has become established in the US among people with no Irish background, but is less popular in England and Wales.

The form Karen, of Danish origin, is now often considered an independent name in English.

Diminutives include Katie, Katy, Kate, Kathy, Kathe, Kath, Kay, Kat, Katja/Katya, Kota, Katyusha, Katrya, Kitty, Kit, Kasia, and others.

Other languages 

 Αἰκατερίνη (Ancient Greek)
 Aikaterine (Old French)
 Akaterina (Turkish)
 Cadi (Welsh)
 Cáit (Irish)
 Caitlín (Irish)
 Caitlin (English)
 Caitlyn (English)
 Caitria (Irish)
 Caitrín (Irish)
 Caitrina (Irish)
 Caitríona (Irish)
 Caja (Danish)
 Cajsa (Swedish)
 Caren (English)
 Carin (English)
 Carina (Portuguese)
 Carine (French; spelled Karien in Afrikaans)
 Caryn (English)
 Cat (English)
 Cát Linh (Vietnamese)
 Cătălina (Romanian)
 Catalina (Italian, Spanish)
 Catant (French)
 Catarina (Galician, Italian, Portuguese, Spanish, Neapolitan)
 Cate (English)
 Cateline (Old French)
 Cateliña (Galician)
 Caterina (Catalan, Italian, Romanian)
 Caterine (Old French)
 Cathanne (English, French)
 Cathareau (French)
 Catharina (Dutch, Swedish)
 Catharine (English)
 Catherin (English)
 Catherina (Spanish)
 Catherine (English, French)
 Catherne (17th century English)
 Cathey (Nordic)
 Cathie (English)
 Cathleen (English, Hiberno-English)
 Cathrin (German)
 Cathrine (Scandinavian)
 Cathrinus (Latinized, male)
 Cathryn (English)
 Cathy (English)
 Cati (Italian)
 Catia (Italian)
 Cátia (Portuguese)
 Catie (English)
 Catina (Romanian)
 Catinca (Romanian)
 Catja (Danish)
 Catlin (Middle English)
 Cato (Dutch)
 Catraoine (Irish)
 Catreena (Manx)
 Catreeney (Manx)
 Catrien (Dutch)
 Catrin (German, Welsh)
 Catrine (Swedish)
 Catrinel (Romanian)
 Catrina (Romanian)
 Catrìona (Scottish Gaelic)
 Catterina (Italian)
 Catuxa (Galician)
 Caty (Italian)
 Ecaterina (Romanian)
 ეკა Eka (Georgian)
 Екатерина Ekaterina (Bulgarian, Macedonian)
 Екатерина Ekaterina, Jekaterina, Yekaterina (Russian)
 Ekaterina (Latvian)
 ეკატერინე Ekaterine (Georgian)
  Gaa Fu Lin (Hong Kong Cantonese)
 Գադարա Gadara (Armenian)
 Կատարինէ Gadarine (Armenian)
 Gáhteriinná Sami
 Gáre Sami
 Gáren Sami
 Jekaterina (Estonian)
 Kaarat Greenlandic
 Kaarin (Estonian)
 Kaarina (Finnish)
 Kaatje (Dutch)
 Kaća (Serbian)
 Кацярына / Kaciaryna (Belarusian)
 Կատարա Kadara (Armenian)
 Կատարինէ Kadarine (Armenian)
 Kadi (Estonian)
 Kadri (Estonian)
 Kaety (English)
 Káhtariinná Sami
 Kai (Estonian, Swedish)
 Kaia (Estonian, Norwegian)
 Kaie (Estonian)
 Kaight (English)
 Kaija (Finnish)
 Kaila (English)
 Kaili (Estonian)
 Kailie (English, French)
 Kailani (Hawaiian)
 Καιλαύρα / كلارا / Kelavra (Greek,  Arabic, German)
 Kailua (Hawaiian)
 Καινά / كائنا / Kena (English, Greek, Arabic)
 Καίρα / كيرا / Kera (Greek, Arabic)
 Καίρη / كيري/カイリ / Keri (Greek, Arabic, Japanese, Hawaiian)
 Καίρια (Keria) (Greek, Arabic)
 Kairi (Arabic, Estonian, Greek, Japanese)
 Kairia (Arabic, Estonian, Greek, Japanese)
 Kaisa (Estonian, Finnish)
  Kai Sa Lin (traditional Chinese)
 凯瑟琳 Kai Se Lin (simplified Chinese)
 Kaisu (Finnish)
 Kait (English)
 Kaitlan (English)
 Kaitlane (English)
 Kaitlin (English)
 Kaitline (English)
 Kaitlyn (English)
 Kaitlynne (English)
 Kaitrin (German, Swedish)
 Kaitrina (Dutch, English, German, Swedish)
 Kaity (English)
 Kaj (Swedish, male)
 Kaja (Scandinavian, Estonian, Polish)
 Kajsa (Swedish)
 Kakalina (Hawaiian)
 Kalena (Hawaiian)
 Kalina (Hawaiian)
 Katerina (Albanian)
 Катерина (Ukrainian)
 Κάρα (Kara) (Arabic, English, Greek, Japanese)
 Káre (Sami)
 Káren (Sami)
 Karen (Danish, English, German, Norwegian, Dutch)
 Karena (English)
 Karenina (English, Scandinavian, Russian)
 Karentina (English, Scandinavian, Russian)
 Kari (Norwegian)
 Kary (Norwegian)
 Karia (Norwegian)
 Karien (Afrikaans, Dutch)
 Kariinná (Sami)
 Karin (Afrikaans, Dutch, Estonian, Faroese, Finnish, German, Swedish)
 Karina (English)
 Կարինե / Karine (Armenian, French)
 Karoun (Arabic, Armenian)
 Karyn (English)
 Karyna (English, Polish)
 笠利 Kasari (Japanese)
 Kat (English)
 Kata (Croatian, Finnish, Hungarian)
 Katalin (Basque, Hungarian)
 Katalina (Basque, Esperanto, Hungarian)
 Katariina (Estonian, Finnish)
 Katarin (Basque, Breton)
 Katarína (Slovak)
 Katarina (Bosnian, Croatian, Esperanto, German, Hungarian, Macedonian, Serbian, Slovene, Swedish, Turkish)
 Katarine (German)
 Katarino (Esperanto)
 Katarzyna (Polish)
 Kate (Croatian, English)
 Kate (English)
 Katerine (Old French)
 Katen (Dutch)
 Katelijn (Dutch)
 Katelijne (Dutch)
 Καίτη (Keti) (Greek)
 Καίτυ (Kety) (Greek)
 Katia (Italian)
 Kátia (Portuguese)
 Κάτια (Katia) (Greek)
 Katya (Russian), (Bulgarian), (Ukrainian)
 Katelin (English)
 Kateline (Middle English)
 Katell (Breton)
 Katelyn (English)
 Katelynn (English)
 Katelynne (English)
 Katenka (Russian)
 Kateri (Mohawk)
 Katerien (Afrikaans), (Dutch)
 Kateřina (Czech)
 Κατερίνα/Katerina (Albanian, Bulgarian, Greek, Latin, Macedonian, Russian, Ukrainian)
 Katerine (Middle English)
 Katerino (Esperanto)
 Kateřina (Czech)
 Kateryna (Ukrainian)
 Katerynka (Ukrainian)
 Καθαλαύρα/Kathalavra (Greek, German)
 Καθάνδρα (Kathandra) (Greek)
 Καθανδρέα (Kathandrea) (Greek)
 Kathani (Hindi, Arabic)
 Kathanna (English, German)
 Kathanne (English, French)
 Kathareau (French)
 Katharina (German, Latin)
 Katharine (English), (German) (Dutch)
 Καθαρσία (Katharsia) (Greek)
 Käthe (German)
 Kathelijne (Dutch)
 Katherina (English, German)
 Katherne (17th century English)
 Katheryn (English)
 Katheryne (English)
 Kathey (Gaelic)
 Kathi (English)
 Kathie (English)
 Kathianna (English)
 Kathianne (English)
 Kathlaura (English, German)
 Kathlauren (English, German)
 Kathlaurie (English, French, German)
 Kathleanna (English, German)
 Kathleanne (English, French)
 Kathleen (English, Hiberno-English)
 Kathlyn (English)
 Kathreena (Malayalam)
 Kathrina (German)
 Kathrin (German)
 Kathru (Malayalam)
 Kathryn (English)
 Kathy (English)
 Kati (Estonian, Finnish, Hungarian)
 Катя Katya, Katia, Katja (Russian, Ukrainian)
 Katica (Croatian, Czech, Serbian, Slovene, Hungarian)
 Katie (English)
 Katika (Danish)
 Κατίνα (Katina) (Greek)
 Κatina, Katinja (Esperanto)
 Katinka (Afrikaans, German, Hungarian, Russian)
 Katixa (Basque)
 Katja (Croatian, Dutch, Finnish, German, Russian, Slovene, Ukrainian)
 Katka (Czech, Russian)
 Katlyn (English)
 Kätlin (Estonian)
 კატო Kato (Georgian)
 Kató (Hungarian)
 Katóka (Hungarian)
 Katre (Estonian)
 Katri (Finnish)
 Katrian (Afrikaans, Dutch, Flemish Dutch)
 Katriana (Portuguese, Spanish)
 Katrianna (Danish, Dutch, English, German, Norwegian, Swedish)
 Katrianne (English, French)
 Katrien (Afrikaans, Dutch, Flemish Dutch)
 Katriin (Estonian)
 Katriina (Finnish)
 Katrijn (Dutch, spelled 'Katryn' in Afrikaans and German, see below)
 Katrin (Estonian, Faroese, German, Swedish)
 Katrina (English)
 Katrīna (Latvian)
 Katrine (Dutch, French, Gaelic, Scandinavian)
 Katrinka (Dutch, German, Russian)
 Katushka (Russian)
 Katrusia (Ukrainian)
 Katuška (Czech)
 Katriona (English)
 Katryn (Afrikaans, German)
 Katy (English)
 Kay (English)
 Kaye (English)
 Kerry (Hiberno-English)
 ქეთა Keta (Georgian)
 ქეთევან Ketevan (Georgian)
 ქეთი Keti (Georgian)
 ქეთო Keto (Georgian)
 Ketlen
 Ketlin (Estonian)
 Ketrina (Albanian)
 Kitty (English)
 Koto (Hungarian)
 Kotryna (Lithuanian)
 Кася / Kasia (Belarusian)
 Kasia (Polish)
 Kaśka (Polish)
 Kasieńka (Polish)
 Kyla (English)
 Kylie (English, French)
 Kysa (Finnish)
 Nienke (Dutch)
 Nynke (Frisian)
 Qatherine (French)
 Quatherine (French)
 Reina (Japanese, Yiddish)
 Riin (Estonian)
 Riina (Estonian, Finnish)
 Rina (Croatian)
 Triin (Estonian)
 Triinu (Estonian)
 Trijn (Dutch)
 Trijntje (Dutch)
 Trina (German)
 Trinchen (German)
 Trine (Danish, German)
 Trīne (Latvian)
 Trinette (French)
 Tríona (Irish Gaelic)

See also
 Caterina
 Catherina
 
 
 
 
 
 St. Catherine (disambiguation)
 Ecaterina
 Ekaterina
 Karen (name), usually a feminine given name, derived from the Danish short form of Katherine
 Catriona

References

Feminine given names
Given names
Given names of Greek language origin